Miroslav Škumát is a Czech professional ice hockey player in Slovakia with MHC Martin of the Slovak Extraliga.

References

External links

Living people
MHC Martin players
1987 births
People from Bílovec
Czech ice hockey forwards
Sportspeople from the Moravian-Silesian Region
Czech expatriate ice hockey players in Slovakia